Richmond County Courthouse may refer to:

Old Government House (Augusta, Georgia), also known as the Old Richmond County Courthouse
Richmond County Courthouse (Staten Island), New York
Third County Courthouse (Staten Island), the previous courthouse on Staten Island
Richmond County Courthouse (North Carolina), Rockingham, North Carolina
Richmond County Courthouse (Virginia), Warsaw, Virginia